Wollert is a given name. Notable people with the given name include:

Wollert Keilhau (1894–1958), Norwegian librarian and encyclopedist
Wollert Konow (merchant) (1779–1839), Norwegian merchant and politician
Wollert Konow (Prime Minister of Norway) (1845–1924), Norwegian politician
Wollert Konow (Hedemarken politician) (1847–1932), Norwegian politician
Wollert Krohn-Hansen (1889—1973), Norwegian theologian and pastor
Wollert Nygren (1906–1988), Norwegian speed skater

See also
Wollert (surname)